Chingkankousaurus (named for Ch'ing-kang-kou, sic for Wade–Giles Chin1-kang1-k'ou3, pinyin Jin-gang-kou 'diamond port'  village) is a genus of theropod dinosaur containing the single species Chingkankousaurus fragilis. C. fragilis is known only from a single fossilized bone fragment (specimen number IVPP V636) from the late Cretaceous Period Wangshi Series of Shandong province in eastern China.

Description
Chingkankousaurus was identified by Yang Zhongjian (C.C. Young) in 1958 from a single "scapula", which he said "basically resembles that of Allosaurus but is smaller." It had been proposed that the scapula was a rib or gastralia fragment, but this was considered unlikely in a 2013 study. Molnar et al. (1990) thought the scapula may have belonged to a tyrannosaurid. Chure (2001) assigned it to the Coelurosauria, and more recent research has supported the initial identification as a type of tyrannosauroid, with some even arguing it to be a synonym of Tarbosaurus bataar, though it is currently considered a nomen dubium among that group.

References

Late Cretaceous dinosaurs of Asia
Tyrannosaurs
Nomina dubia
Taxa named by Yang Zhongjian
Fossil taxa described in 1958